The 2019 Shenzhen Open was a tennis tournament played on outdoor hard courts. It was the seventh edition of the Shenzhen Open, and part of the WTA International tournaments of the 2019 WTA Tour. It took place at the Shenzhen Longgang Sports Center in Shenzhen, China, from 31 December 2018 to 5 January 2019.

Points and prize money

Point distribution

Prize money

1 Qualifiers prize money is also the Round of 32 prize money
* per team

Singles main draw entrants

Seeds

1 Rankings as of December 24, 2018.

Other entrants
The following players received wildcards into the singles main draw:
  Peng Shuai
  Wang Xinyu 
  Vera Zvonareva

The following player received entry into the singles main draw using a protected ranking:
  Timea Bacsinszky
 
The following players received entry from the qualifying draw:
  Ivana Jorović 
  Veronika Kudermetova 
  Monica Niculescu
  Xun Fangying

Retirements
  Peng Shuai (right thigh injury)
  Maria Sharapova (left thigh injury)
  Wang Xinyu (cramping)
  Vera Zvonareva (left hip injury)

Doubles main draw entrants

Seeds

1 Rankings as of December 24, 2018

Other entrants 
The following pairs received wildcards into the doubles main draw:
  Chen Jiahui /  Wang Danni
  Wang Xinyu /  Xun Fangying
The following pairs received entry as alternates:
  Anastasia Pavlyuchenkova /  Natalia Vikhlyantseva

Withdrawals
Before the tournament
  Wang Yafan (left adductor strain)
  Saisai Zheng (viral illness)

During the tournament
  Natalia Vikhlyantseva (right forearm injury)

Champions

Singles

  Aryna Sabalenka def.  Alison Riske, 4–6, 7–6(7–2), 6–3

Doubles

  Peng Shuai /  Yang Zhaoxuan def.  Duan Yingying /  Renata Voráčová, 6–4, 6–3

References

External links
Official website 

2019 in Chinese tennis
2019 WTA Tour
January 2019 sports events in China
2019